Matthew 27:52 is the fifty-second verse of the twenty-seventh chapter of the Gospel of Matthew in the New Testament. This verse describes some of the events that occurred upon death of Jesus, particularly the report that tombs broke open and the saints inside were resurrected.

Content
The original Koine Greek, according to Westcott and Hort, reads:
καὶ τὰ μνημεῖα ἀνεῴχθησαν καὶ πολλὰ σώματα τῶν κεκοιμημένων ἁγίων ἠγέρθησαν,

In the King James Version of the Bible, it is translated as:
And the graves were opened; and many bodies of the saints which slept arose,

The modern World English Bible translates the passage as:
The tombs were opened, and many bodies of the saints who had fallen asleep were raised.

Analysis
The raising of holy people who had died points to 'the resurrection of the last days' which starts with Jesus' resurrection. The temple area is located on a geological fault, and the tremors from time to time cause damage to the buildings until the modern times.

Johann Bengel suggests that the "saints" or "holy people" were "those who had died either a long while before the birth of Christ, or not much after".

There is no parallel record to this event in other gospels or contemporary documents, and the account in Matthew does not have enough detail, for example, no explanation is given for the delay between the opening of the tombs on the day of Jesus' death and the appearance of raised holy people in Jerusalem after Jesus' resurrection, so the story is mainly taken for its fairly clear symbolism. Nonetheless, these signs were surely known by many, that Paul could say to King Agrippa, "this thing was not done in a corner".

Notes

References

Sources

27:52